Ashland Theological Seminary is a seminary in Ohio. It is located at 910 Center Street in Ashland, Ohio, with another site located in Cleveland, Ohio. The seminary has students and faculty representing over 30 denominations and over 4100 alumni. Founded in 1906 by the Brethren Church, Ashland Theological Seminary is a graduate division of Ashland University. The seminary is accredited by the Association of Theological Schools in the United States and Canada and the North Central Association of Colleges and Schools. The Master of Arts in Clinical Mental Health Counseling Program is accredited by The Council for Accreditation of Counseling & Related Educational Programs (CACREP).

The faculty, administration, and staff at Ashland Theological Seminary are dedicated to the task of "Equipping Modern Day Disciples".

The seminary's core values include scripture, spiritual formation, community, and academic excellence.

Degrees
Courses at Ashland Theological Seminary are offered in-person, online, and as hybrid courses. Degrees offered include:
Master of Divinity
Master of Divinity (Chaplaincy)
Master of Arts in Christian Ministry
Master of Arts in Applied Bible and Theology
Master of Arts in Clinical Mental Health Counseling (CACREP)
Master of Arts in Black Church Studies
Master of Arts (Biblical Studies)
Master of Arts (Historical and Theological Studies)
Doctor of Ministry
Various certificate programs

References

External links
Official website

Seminaries and theological colleges in Ohio
Education in Ashland County, Ohio
Ashland University
Educational institutions established in 1906
1906 establishments in Ohio